Eagle Hill is a mountain in the Central New York region of New York northeast of Cooperstown. Otsego Lake is located west of Eagle Hill.

References

Mountains of Otsego County, New York
Mountains of New York (state)